The Crowe Baronetcy, of Llanherne in the County of Carmarthen, was a title in the Baronetage of England. It was created on 8 July 1627 for the politician Sackville Crowe. The title became extinct on the death of his son, the second Baronet, in 1706.

Crowe baronets, of Llanherne (1627)
Sir Sackville Crowe, 1st Baronet (died 1683)
Sir Sackville Crowe, 2nd Baronet (–1706)

References

Crowe